Diana Cicely Keppel, Countess of Albemarle, DBE (née Grove, 6 August 1909 – 6 May 2013), married Walter Egerton George Lucian Keppel, son of Arnold Allen Cecil Keppel, 8th Earl of Albemarle, as his second wife on 24 February 1931 at St Columba's Church, London. She became Countess of Albemarle from 12 April 1942 when her husband became the 9th Earl of Albemarle.

Background
The daughter of Major John Archibald Grove and his wife Cicely, she was educated at the Sherborne School for Girls, Sherborne, Dorset.

Honours
She was chairman of the Albemarle Report on Youth and Development in the Community in 1960.  She was appointed Dame Commander of the Order of the British Empire (DBE) in 1956. She received honorary degrees from the University of Reading (1959, D.Litt.), the University of London (1960, LLD) and the University of Oxford (1960, DCL).

By 1999, she was living at Seymours, Melton, near Woodbridge, Suffolk. She was the Dowager Countess of Albemarle from the death of her husband in 1979 until her death on 6 May 2013 at the age of 103. They had one daughter, Lady Anne-Louise Mary Keppel (17 March 1932 – 7 January 2017).

Career
 Norfolk County Organiser, Women's Voluntary Service, 1939–1944
 Chairman, National Federation of Women's Institutes, 1946–1951
 Chairman, Development Commission, 1948–1974
 Chairman, Departmental Committee on Youth Service, 1958–1960
 Chairman, National Youth Employment Council, 1962–1968
 Vice-Chair, British Council, 1959–1974
 Member, Arts Council, 1951
 Member, Royal Commission on the Civil Service, 1954
 Member, UGG, 1956–1978
 Member, Standing Commission on Museums and Galleries, 1958–1971
 Member, English Local Government Boundary Commission, 1971–1977
 Life Trustee, Carnegie UK Trust, and Chairman, 1977–1982
 Member, Glyndebourne Arts Trust, 1968–1980

References

Sources
 Peter W. Hammond, editor, The Complete Peerage or a History of the House of Lords and All its Members From the Earliest Times, Volume XIV: Addenda & Corrigenda (Stroud, Gloucestershire: Sutton Publishing, 1998), p. 18.
 Charles Mosley, editor, Burke's Peerage, Baronetage & Knightage, 107th edition, 3 volumes (Wilmington, Delaware: Burke's Peerage (Genealogical Books) Ltd, 2003), volume 1, p. 65.
 Charles Mosley, editor, Burke's Peerage and Baronetage, 106th edition, 2 volumes (Crans, Switzerland: Burke's Peerage (Genealogical Books) Ltd, 1999), volume 1, p. 49.

1909 births
2013 deaths
People educated at Sherborne Girls
British centenarians
English countesses
Dames Commander of the Order of the British Empire
Diana Keppel, Countess of Albemarle
People from London
People associated with the University of East Anglia
Women centenarians